Bath and North East Somerset (commonly referred to as BANES or B&NES) is a unitary authority created on 1 April 1996, following the abolition of the County of Avon, which had existed since 1974. It stretches from the outskirts of Bristol, south into the Mendip Hills and east to the southern Cotswold Hills and Wiltshire border. The city of Bath is the principal settlement in the district, but BANES also covers Keynsham, Midsomer Norton, Radstock and the Chew Valley. The area has a population of 170,000, about half of whom live in Bath, making it 12 times more densely populated than the rest of the area.

In the United Kingdom, the term listed building refers to a building or other structure officially designated as being of special architectural, historical, or cultural significance; Grade II* structures are those considered to be "particularly significant buildings of more than local interest". Listing was begun by a provision in the Town and Country Planning Act 1947. Once listed, strict limitations are imposed on the modifications allowed to a building's structure or fittings. In England, the authority for listing under the Planning (Listed Buildings and Conservation Areas) Act 1990 rests with Historic England, a non-departmental public body sponsored by the Department for Digital, Culture, Media and Sport; local authorities have a responsibility to regulate and enforce the planning regulations.

Bath and North East Somerset has 212 Grade II* listed buildings.

Buildings

Bath

|}

North East Somerset
Listed buildings in North East Somerset, outside Bath:

|}

See also
 Grade II* listed buildings in Somerset
 Grade I listed buildings in Bath and North East Somerset

Notes

References

External links

 
Lists of Grade II* listed buildings in Somerset
Grade II*